Daniel Ebenezer Koum Koum (born 25 May 1985, in Douala) is a Cameroon-born Australian weightlifter in the −62 kg category. In the 2011 World Weightlifting Championships that were held in Paris, France, Koum placed 29th overall with a 112 kg snatch and a 145 kg clean and jerk.

Weightlifting career
At the age of 15, Koum moved to Yaounde, Cameroon and began lifting weights inside a gym owned by his father. He developed the strength required to allow him to represent Cameroon in several international competitions such as the 2005 World Weightlifting Championships and the 2006 Commonwealth Games. He finished 5th in the 2006 Commonwealth Games.

During the 2006 Commonwealth Games in Melbourne, Koum was granted a sports visa to compete in the games. After the completion of the games, Koum chose to stay in Australia and sought asylum. After two years, he was granted Australian citizenship and was free to represent Australia in international competitions. As an Australian competitor, Koum won the Oceania Weightlifting Championships gold medal for three years running, and became a dual Victorian and Australian Championships gold medalist.

After competing in the 2012 Oceania Weightlifting Championships, it was alleged that Kuom had demanded, and received, $5000 from Australian team officials prior to agreeing to compete. Kuom was required to lift in order to allow an Australian competitor to qualify for the 2012 London Olympics. Koum has denied the allegations.

References 

1985 births
Living people
Australian male weightlifters
Weightlifters at the 2006 Commonwealth Games
Commonwealth Games competitors for Cameroon